William Lister (Lefty) Rogers (February 6, 1902 – November 13, 1987) was an American rugby union player who competed with the team in the 1924 Summer Olympics when it won the gold medal.  He graduated from Stanford University in 1923 and then went on to get his M.D. in 1926 from the same university; in 1966 he became a member of the university's board of trustees.  He became  one of the founding members of the American Board of Thoracic Surgery.  Besides rugby he also played basketball at Stanford.

References

External links
profile

1902 births
1987 deaths
American rugby union players
Rugby union players at the 1924 Summer Olympics
Olympic gold medalists for the United States in rugby
United States international rugby union players
Medalists at the 1924 Summer Olympics
Stanford University trustees
Stanford University alumni
20th-century American academics